Shaveh or Shavah may refer to:

 Shaveh, Hamadan
 Shaveh, Markazi
 Shaveh-ye Abdollah-e Amuri
 Shaveh-ye Beyt Hamid
 Shaveh-ye Beyt Mansur
 Shaveh-ye Eyn-e Yebareh
 Shaveh-ye Marun-e Seh
 Shaveh-ye Mazzandeh
 Shaveh-ye Seyvan
 Shaveh-ye Ud-e Taqi

See also
 Hesar-e Shaveh